Archips viola is a species of moth of the family Tortricidae. It is found in China (Heilongjiang), Korea, Japan, Russia (Primorye, Ussuri) and Central Asia.

The wingspan is 18–21 mm for males and 21–27 mm for females.

The larvae feed on Acer rufinerve, Alnus hirsuta, Populus sieboldii, Aralia mandschurica, Carpinus cordata, Corylus heterophylla, Juglans mandschurica, Lespedeza bicolor, Lonicera edulis, Pyrus ussuriensis, Quercus mongolica, Sorbaria sorbifolia, Syringa amurensis and Ulmus laciniata.

References

Moths described in 1965
Archips
Moths of Asia